The AFF U-20 Youth Championship 2007 was held in Ho Chi Minh City, Vietnam from 31 July to 13 August 2007.

Participating nations

Tournament

Group stage

Group A

Group B

Knockout stage

Bracket

Semi-finals

Third place play-off

Final

Winner

Goalscorers 

5 goals
 Kraikitti In-utane

4 goals
 Nguyen Dinh Hiep

3 goals
 K. Gurusamy
 Pyae Phyo Oo
 Nirunrit Jaroensuk
 Nguyen Van Quan

2 goals
 Phoutthavong Sapackdy
 Sayya Meungmany
 Ahmad Fakri Saarani
 Firdaus Azizul
 Yusaini Che Saad
 Kyaw Kyaw Khine
 Sarawut Masuk
 Yodrak Namueangrak
 Hoàng Văn Bình
 Nguyen Hong Viet

1 goal
 Abdul Razak Azeman
 Abdullehem Hayyaruzzon Meriaddin
 Keo Phokphon
 Phatthana Syvilay
 Yusanee Saad
 Mohd Syazwan Zinon
 Abdul Shukor Jusoh
 Mohd Shazlan Alias
 Aung Mung Kyaw Mo
 Myint Naing
 Naing Lin Tun
 Zin Myo Aung
 Gabriel Quak
 Ng Heng Meng Seng
 Attapong Nooprom
 Kroekrit Thaweekarn
 Natthaphon Banmairurdi
 Tran Tan Dat
 Trần Mạnh Dũng
 Pham Van Guy
 Nguyễn Đức Nhân

Own goal
 Abdul Aziz Tamit (for Thailand)
 Hout Sokunthea (for Vietnam)
 Zoo Noo Kyaw Thuu Ray (for Thailand) Chu Ngọc Anh (for Thailand)''

References

External links 
"AFF U-20 Youth Championship 2007" at ASEAN Football Federation.
Vietnam squad at VietnamNet.vn
Malaysia squad at ASEAN Football Federation
Singapore squad at Football Association Singapore

3
2007
Aff U-20 Youth Championship, 2007
2007
2007 in youth association football